ModelSaint is an American hard rock band from Los Angeles, California, United States.

The band was formed in 2010 by Skyla Talon (guitars and lead vocals).  From 2005- 2008 Skyla was on full-time guitar duty as a member of Scum of the Earth, a band fronted by former Rob Zombie guitarist Riggs. Skyla is also well known for the long established band gutter rock band Killingbird, who recently released their album Scar in 2009.

Dan Laudo from the metal band Prong is the backbone in ModelSaint. Dan got his drumming start by teaming up with future Nine Inch Nails founder Trent Reznor. Dan met up with Skyla Talon in 2007 while on tour with Scum of the Earth. The teaming up kickstarted the song writing process and led to the formation of ModelSaint in 2010. Early 2011, the band adding Kevin Lewis, former tattoo artist and member of Factory 81 and LiftPoint. Rounding out the line-up is the Chicago-based guitarist, Kyle Hickey. 

ModelSaint's video for "Starin' Down A Loaded Barrel" was released in November 2010. Their debut CD is scheduled for release in 2012.

References

External links
ModelSaint Official website
ModelSaint on YouTube

Glam metal musical groups from California
Hard rock musical groups from California
Heavy metal musical groups from California
Musical groups from Los Angeles